The 2022 New York gubernatorial election took place on November 8, 2022, to elect the governor and lieutenant governor of New York. Incumbent Democratic Party Governor Kathy Hochul won a full term in office, defeating Republican Party Congressman Lee Zeldin in the closest New York gubernatorial election since 1994 and the closest Democratic victory since 1982. Hochul's election marked the first time that a woman was elected to the state's governorship.

Hochul ascended to the governorship in August 2021, upon Andrew Cuomo's resignation following allegations of sexual harassment. She sought a full term as governor. She appointed Brian Benjamin to the position of lieutenant governor and planned to run alongside him until he too resigned in April 2022. Congressman Antonio Delgado was appointed to replace Benjamin as lieutenant governor. Hochul defeated Jumaane Williams and Thomas Suozzi in the Democratic primary for governor, while Delgado defeated Ana Maria Archila and Diana Reyna in the Democratic primary for lieutenant governor.

Zeldin ran as the Republican nominee, having defeated Rob Astorino, Andrew Giuliani, and Harry Wilson in the Republican primary. Zeldin selected Alison Esposito, an NYPD officer, as his running mate, and she won unopposed in the primary. Esposito was the first openly gay major party nominee for statewide office in New York.

In the general election, Hochul defeated Zeldin, but by a closer margin than what is typical of New York, a solidly Democratic state in statewide elections, with Hochul's margin of victory of 6.4% being significantly worse than Cuomo's margin of 23.4% that he achieved in 2018. While Hochul was able to flip the counties of Schenectady and Columbia in Upstate New York, Zeldin made gains in the New York City metropolitan area, flipping the counties of Rockland, Richmond (Staten Island), Nassau, and Suffolk.

This was the first New York gubernatorial election in over 80 years not featuring any third-party candidates after the New York State Board of Elections rejected the petitions of all the minor parties that put forward candidates. Hochul became the first elected New York governor from outside New York City and its immediate suburbs since 1932 when Franklin Delano Roosevelt left office. Hochul also became the first elected governor from north of Hyde Park since Nathan L. Miller in 1922, in addition to being the first from Western New York since Horace White in 1910 and the first from Buffalo since Grover Cleveland in 1885.

Zeldin received the highest percentage of the vote for a Republican gubernatorial nominee since 2002 and the highest raw vote total for a Republican gubernatorial nominee since 1970. This election was also the first time since 2002 in which neighboring Pennsylvania voted to the left of New York for a gubernatorial election.

Democratic primary
In August 2021, after New York Governor Andrew Cuomo announced his resignation, then-Lieutenant Governor Kathy Hochul announced that she would run for governor in 2022. Hochul was sworn in as governor of New York on August 24, 2021. Hochul was elected to the position of lieutenant governor in 2014, and was re-elected in 2018; in both elections, she was Cuomo's running mate.

New York Attorney General Letitia James garnered attention for releasing a report on her office's investigation into alleged sexual harassment by Cuomo; the release of this report helped lead to Cuomo's resignation in August 2021. James announced her gubernatorial campaign in October 2021 and was considered a formidable challenger to Hochul.

On November 12, 2021, Newsday reported that Hochul had raised $10 million in campaign donations since taking office as governor. On November 16, 2021, New York City Public Advocate Jumaane Williams, described by CNN as "a progressive favorite from Brooklyn", announced his 2022 gubernatorial bid. Williams ran for lieutenant governor against Hochul in 2018, losing a close race. On November 29, 2021, U.S. Rep. Tom Suozzi of Long Island announced that he was running for governor. According to  The New York Times Suozzi is known as a "vocal centrist" and announced an intent to bill himself as a "'common-sense Democrat'". Suozzi was considered to have the potential to siphon votes away from Hochul.

In early December, James withdrew her candidacy and chose to seek re-election as attorney general instead. James' withdrawal from the race was seen as a positive development for Hochul, as James had been considered the second-strongest candidate in the race. The exit of James boosted the campaign of Williams, who became the only major candidate from New York City and the clear choice for the left wing of the Democratic Party.

On February 17, 2022, at the New York State Democratic Convention, Hochul was selected as the preferred Democratic candidate for governor of New York in 2022. At the convention, Hochul received 85.6% of the weighted vote, while Williams received 12.5%. Neither Williams nor Suozzi received sufficient support to obtain automatic ballot access and force a primary election; however, both candidates were "expected to work the alternate method of gathering the 15,000 signatures to get on the ballot for the June primary".

Although the candidates for governor and lieutenant governor are nominated separately, those running for governor may choose to endorse a candidate for lieutenant governor as their unofficial running mate; currently, all three have done so (Hochul had previously chosen Brian Benjamin, but switched to Antonio Delgado after Benjamin's arrest).

Hochul won the primary by a large margin.

Governor

Candidates

Nominee 
Kathy Hochul, incumbent Governor of New York (2021–present) (running with Antonio Delgado)

Lost in primary 
Jumaane Williams, New York City Public Advocate (2019–present); candidate for lieutenant governor in 2018 (running with Ana María Archila)

Disqualified
Paul Nichols, lawyer and legislative staffer (running with David Englert)

Withdrew
 Andrew Cuomo, former Governor of New York (2011–2021)
Letitia James, Attorney General of New York (2019–present) (running for re-election)

Declined
Charles Barron, New York City Councilmember from the 42nd district (2002–2013, 2021–present); state assembly member from the 60th district (2015–present)
Bill de Blasio, mayor of New York City (2014–2021); candidate for president of the United States in 2020
Thomas DiNapoli, New York State Comptroller (2007–present) (running for re-election)
Kirsten Gillibrand, U.S. Senator from New York (2009–present); candidate for president of the United States in 2020 (endorsed Hochul)
Svante Myrick, mayor of Ithaca (2012–2022)
Cynthia Nixon, actress, activist and candidate for governor of New York in 2018
Christine Quinn, Speaker of the New York City Council (2006–2013)
Jessica Ramos, state senator from the 13th district (2019–present)
Kathleen Rice, U.S. representative for NY-04 (2015–present) (endorsed Hochul)
Al Sharpton, civil rights activist
Andrea Stewart-Cousins, Majority Leader of the New York State Senate (2019–present); state senator from the 35th district (2007–present) (endorsed Hochul) (running for reelection)

Endorsements

Debates

Polling
Graphical summary

Results

Lieutenant Governor
On April 12, 2022, incumbent lieutenant governor Brian Benjamin resigned from office after being arrested for campaign finance violations. Despite this, he did not officially withdraw from the race, so under the laws of the time, he could only be removed if he moved out of New York, ran for a different office, or died. On May 3, 2022, Hochul announced her intent to appoint Representative Antonio Delgado to the position of lieutenant governor after a bill passed the New York General Assembly allowing Benjamin to be removed from the ticket. Delgado won the primary by a large margin.

Candidates

Nominee 
Antonio Delgado, Lieutenant Governor (2022–present), former U.S. Representative from New York's 19th congressional district (2019–2022)

Lost in primary 
Ana María Archila, Center for Popular Democracy transition advisor and former co-executive director, co-founder of Make the Road New York
Diana Reyna, Deputy Borough President of Brooklyn (2014–2018), New York City Councilor from the 34th district (2001–2013)

Disqualified

David Englert, Mayor of Sodus

Withdrawn
Brian Benjamin, Lieutenant Governor of New York (2021–2022), state senator from the 30th district (2017–2021); candidate for New York City Comptroller in 2021

Declined
Svante Myrick, mayor of Ithaca (2012–2022)

Endorsements

Results

Republican primary
In June 2020, Lewis County sheriff Mike Carpinelli became the first Republican to enter the race. He was the only announced challenger until Long Island congressman Lee Zeldin announced his own campaign in April 2021; he announced by the end of the month that the Erie and Niagara Counties' Republican Party chairs had endorsed his campaign, giving him the necessary 50% of state committee support to gain the Republican nomination. Trump administration official Andrew Giuliani and 2014 New York gubernatorial nominee Rob Astorino made campaign announcements the following month. Contractor and podcast host Derrick Gibson was also in the race.

In June 2021, Zeldin was named the 'presumed nominee' of the New York's Republican Party by state chairman Nick Langworthy after he earned 85 percent of a straw poll vote of county leaders, and was also called the 'presumptive nominee' of New York's Conservative Party by Conservative state chairman Gerard Kassar. As of February 2022, Zeldin had the endorsement of 59 of New York's 62 county Republican committees.

In February 2022, shortly before the Republican convention, businessman Harry Wilson announced his candidacy for governor of New York. Wilson stated that he intended to invest $12 million of his own money in the race.

At the Republican convention in Nassau County, Zeldin received 85 percent support from the party's voting committee members, with Astorino and Wilson receiving 7 percent of the vote each, and Giuliani receiving less than one percent of the vote.

On June 28, 2022, the primary election was held. Astorino's strongest performance was in his native Westchester County, Giuliani performed well across New York City (although Manhattan was won by Zeldin), and Wilson performed best in his native Fulton County. It was Zeldin who won the Republican nomination, receiving the most votes in 48 of New York's 62 counties, including earning 76% of the vote in his native Suffolk County.

Governor

Candidates

Nominee
 Lee Zeldin, U.S. representative for NY-01 (2015–present), state senator from the 3rd district (2011–2014) (running with Alison Esposito)

Lost in primary
 Rob Astorino, Westchester County executive (2010–2017) and gubernatorial nominee in 2014
 Andrew Giuliani, former special assistant to the president, Newsmax TV contributor, and son of former New York City mayor Rudy Giuliani
 Harry Wilson, businessman and Republican nominee for Comptroller in 2010

Disqualified 
Derrick Gibson, contractor and podcast host

Withdrawn 
 Mike Carpinelli, Lewis County sheriff (endorsed Giuliani)

Declined 
John Catsimatidis, businessman, owner of WABC radio and Gristedes Foods, and 2013 candidate for mayor of New York City
Joel Giambra, Erie County executive (2000–2007) (seeking New York State Senate seat)
John Katko, U.S. representative for NY-24 (2015–present) (endorsed Zeldin)
Marc Molinaro, Dutchess County executive (2012–present), state assembly member from the 103rd district (2007–2011), and gubernatorial nominee in 2018 (endorsed Zeldin) (running for U.S. House)
George Pataki, Governor of New York (1995–2006)
Tom Reed, U.S. representative for NY-23 (2010–2022)

Endorsements

Debates

Polling
Graphical summary

Results

Lieutenant Governor

Nominee 
 Alison Esposito, former NYPD Deputy Inspector and commanding officer of Brooklyn's 70th Precinct

Conservative primary 
At the 2022 Conservative Party convention, the party endorsed Congressman Lee Zeldin for governor and NYPD deputy inspector Alison Esposito for Lieutenant Governor.

Governor

Candidates

Official designee 
 Lee Zeldin, U.S. representative for NY-01 (2015–present), state senator from the 3rd district (2011–2014)

Lieutenant Governor

Candidates

Official designee 
 Alison Esposito, former New York City Police Department Deputy Inspector

Working Families primary 
On February 8, 2022, the Working Families Party endorsed New York City Public Advocate Jumaane Williams for the governorship. On February 28, 2022, the party announced that their preferred candidate for Lieutenant Governor was activist Ana María Archila.

Following Hochul and Delgado's respective wins in the Democratic gubernatorial and lieutenant gubernatorial primary, the party filed to put the two Democratic nominees on the Working Families ballot line.

Governor

Official designee 
 Kathy Hochul, Governor of New York (2021–present), former Lieutenant Governor of New York (2015–2021), former U.S. Representative from the 26th district (2011–2013), former Erie County Clerk (2007-2011), former Member of the Hamburg Town Board (1994-2007)

Withdrawn 
 Jumaane Williams, New York City Public Advocate (2019–present); candidate for lieutenant governor of New York in 2018

Lieutenant Governor

Official designee 
 Antonio Delgado, Lieutenant Governor (2022–present), former U.S. Representative from New York's 19th congressional district (2019–2022)

Withdrawn 
 Ana María Archila, executive director of Center for Popular Democracy and co-founder of Make the Road New York

Other parties 
In an unprecedented decision, the New York State Board of Elections rejected all petitions for non-qualified party ballot access in July 2022. Among the parties who submitted rejected petitions:

Libertarian Party 
On February 16, 2022, Larry Sharpe, the Libertarian Party's candidate for Governor of New York in 2018, officially announced his campaign to run for Governor of New York on Kennedy. He received his party's nomination at the convention in Albany on February 19, 2022. In July 2022, the New York State Board of Elections disqualified Sharpe for not meeting the qualifications for ballot access.

Governor

Disqualified 
 Larry Sharpe, activist, businessman and Libertarian nominee for governor in 2018. Ran as a write-in candidate.

Endorsements

Lieutenant Governor

Disqualified 
 Andrew Hollister, Libertarian nominee for lieutenant governor in 2018

Green Party 
On April 25, 2022, Howie Hawkins, who has run for numerous elected offices including Governor of New York launched his campaign. In July 2022, the New York State Board of Elections disqualified Hawkins for not meeting the qualifications for ballot access.

Governor

Disqualified 
 Howie Hawkins, party co-founder and Green/Socialist nominee for President of the United States in 2020. Ran as a write-in candidate.

Lieutenant Governor

Disqualified 
 Jia Lee, special education teacher

Additional parties 
Freedom Party – a petition was filed with the New York State Board of Elections with Skiboky Stora, a 2021 candidate for Mayor of New York City, running for Governor. On June 27, 2022, Stora's petition was ruled invalid at the New York State Board of Elections Commissioners' meeting. In July 2022, the Board of Elections rejected the party's petitions for ballot access.
Independence Party of New York – a petition was filed with the New York State Board of Elections, with the Republican slate seeking to restore the Independence Party line. The party had lost ballot status in 2020. On July 14, 2022, the Board of Elections denied the petitions submitted by the Zeldin campaign, due to contested signatures.
New Visions Party – a petition was filed with the New York State Board of Elections, with Carol Seidelman running for Governor and Benjamin Azah running for Lt. Governor. In July 2022, the Board of Elections rejected the party's petitions for ballot access.
Parent Party – a petition was filed with the New York State Board of Elections, with the Republican slate seeking to create the Parent Party line. The Parent Party endorsed Lee Zeldin and the Republican slate in May 2022. In July 2022, the Board of Elections rejected the party's petitions for ballot access.
Unite Party – a petition was filed with the New York State Board of Elections, with Harry Wilson running for Governor and John Bullis running for Lt. Governor. In July 2022, the Board of Elections rejected the party's petitions for ballot access.

General election
New York has been a solidly Democratic state, and has not elected a Republican to statewide office since George Pataki's win in 2002. Despite this, polls showed the race narrowing, with the main focus of the election being crime. Zeldin accused Hochul of being weak on crime and education issues, promising to declare a statewide crime emergency and to repeal cashless bail, while Hochul attacked him for his ties to former President Donald Trump and the pro-life movement.

Ultimately, Hochul defeated Zeldin by a margin of 6.4%, making her the first woman to be elected governor of New York. Despite his loss, Zeldin's performance was the best a Republican had done since George Pataki's victory in 2002, the closest gubernatorial race since 1994, and the most amount of votes a Republican had received for the position in 52 years, since Nelson Rockefeller in 1970. Additionally, Zeldin's coattails significantly narrowed other statewide races, with Democratic Senator Chuck Schumer, who last won by over 43 points in 2016, only winning by just over 14 points in 2022. Republicans also flipped 4 congressional seats in the state, contributing to them winning the House of Representatives. Due to his overperformance, Zeldin was considered to be a challenger to Ronna McDaniel as chair of the Republican National Committee; however, he later declined though he stated that he will remain in politics.

Predictions

Endorsements

Debate

Polling
Aggregate polls

 

Kathy Hochul vs. Rob Astorino

Kathy Hochul vs. Andrew Giuliani

Kathy Hochul vs. Harry Wilson

Tom Suozzi vs. Harry Wilson

Tom Suozzi vs. Lee Zeldin

Jumaane Williams vs. Rob Astorino

Jumaane Williams vs. Andrew Giuliani

Jumaane Williams vs. Harry Wilson

Jumaane Williams vs. Lee Zeldin

Andrew Cuomo vs. Rob Astorino

Andrew Cuomo vs. Elise Stefanik

Andrew Cuomo vs. Lee Zeldin

Alexandria Ocasio-Cortez vs. Elise Stefanik

Andrew Cuomo vs. generic Republican

Letitia James vs. generic Republican

Generic Democrat vs. generic Republican

Generic Democrat vs. generic Republican with Andrew Cuomo as an independent

Kathy Hochul vs. generic opponent

Antonio Delgado vs. Alison Esposito

Results

By congressional district
Hochul won 14 of 26 congressional districts with the remaining 12 going to Zeldin, including one that elected a Democrat.

Notes

Partisan clients

References

External links 
Official campaign websites
 Kathy Hochul (D) for Governor
 Lee Zeldin (R) for Governor

2022
New York
2022 New York (state) elections